Mokraya Orlovka is a rural locality (a selo) and the administrative center of Mokroorlovskoye Rural Settlement, Grayvoronsky District, Belgorod Oblast, Russia. The population was 552 as of 2010. There are 3 streets.

Geography 
Mokraya Orlovka is located 15 km northwest of Grayvoron (the district's administrative centre) by road. Spodaryushino is the nearest rural locality.

References 

Rural localities in Grayvoronsky District